The Gloucester County Special Services School District is a special education public school district headquartered in the Sewell section of Mantua Township, in Gloucester County, New Jersey. Its schools offer educational and therapeutic services for students of elementary and high school age in Gloucester County who have emotional or physical disabilities that cannot be addressed by their school districts.

As of the 2019–20 school year, the district, comprised of one school, had 101.2 classroom teachers (on an FTE basis).

Schools
Schools in the district (with 2019–20 enrollment data from the National Center for Education Statistics) are:
Bankbridge Elementary School (grades preschool to 6)
Heather Warrington, Principal
Bankbridge Regional School (grades 6-12; with 563 students combined across programs)
Ronald Rutter, Principal
Ralph Ross Jr, South Campus Middle School Principal
Chris Sedgewick, North Campus Principal

Administration
Core members of the district's administration:
Michael Dicken, Superintendent
Amy Capriotti, Business Administrator / Board Secretary

Board of education
The district's board of education, comprised of seven members, sets policy and oversees the fiscal and educational operation of the district through its administration. The county executive superintendent serves as a member, with six other members appointed by the Director of the Board of County Commissioners to three-year terms on a staggered basis, with two terms up for reappointment each year. The board appoints a superintendent to oversee the day-to-day operation of the district.

References

External links

Mantua Township, New Jersey
School districts in Gloucester County, New Jersey
Special schools in the United States